The 2022 Western Athletic Conference baseball tournament will take place beginning on May 25 and ending on May 28. The top four regular season finishers of the league's two divisions will meet in the double-elimination tournament to be held at Hohokam Stadium, spring training home of the Oakland Athletics in Mesa, Arizona. California Baptist, Dixie State, and Tarleton State are ineligible for the postseason as both programs are still in the transition to Division I. The winner will earn the Western Athletic Conference's automatic bid to the 2022 NCAA Division I baseball tournament.

Seeding and format
The top four finishers from each division will be seeded based on conference winning percentage from the regular season.

Results

References

Tournament
Western Athletic Conference Baseball Tournament
Western Athletic Conference baseball tournament